Wodginite is a manganese, tin, tantalum oxide mineral with the chemical formula . It may also include significant amounts of niobium.

Background
Wodginite was first described in 1963 for an occurrence in the Wodgina pegmatite, Wodgina, Pilbara Region, Western Australia.

Typical occurrence of Wodginite occurs in zoned pegmatites in amphibolite. It is associated with tantalite, albite, quartz, muscovite, tapiolite,
microlite and microcline.

It occurs in pegmatites in a wide variety of locations. The most studied is the Tanco pegmatite in Manitoba, Canada; also in Red Lake, Ontario. It is reported from  the Strickland quarry, Portland, Middlesex County, Connecticut; the Herbb #2 pegmatite, Powhatan County, Virginia; the McAllister mine, Rockford, Coosa County, Alabama; the Peerless mine, Pennington County, South Dakota. Also from Paraíba and Minas Gerais, Brazil; Krasonice, Czech Republic;  Orivesi, Finland; Kalba, eastern Kazakhstan; Ankole, Uganda; Miami district, Zimbabwe and 
Karibib and Kohero, Namibia.

References

Oxide minerals
Tantalum minerals
Monoclinic minerals
Minerals in space group 15
Minerals described in 1963